Werneria preussi is a species of toad in the family Bufonidae. It is found in southwestern Cameroon and—highly disjunctly and based on a more than 100 years old record—in Togo. Some sources also mention Equatorial Guinea.

Its natural habitats are rocky streams and waterfalls in submontane forests, but it also occurs in degraded secondary habitats. It lives exclusively in and around water and breeds in streams. It is locally common but probably threatened by loss of its forest caused by agricultural encroachment and human settlement.

References

preussi
Amphibians of Cameroon
Taxonomy articles created by Polbot
Amphibians described in 1893